The Minnesota Department of Labor and Industry is a cabinet-level agency in the State of Minnesota.

Background
The agency employs approximately 430 workers throughout the state and oversees the state's apprenticeship, construction codes and licensing, occupational safety and health, wage and hour standards, and workers' compensation programs.

See also
Department of Corrections
Department of Education
Department of Employment and Economic Development
Metropolitan Council
Metropolitan Sports Facilities Commission
Department of Military Affairs
Department of Natural Resources
Minnesota Pollution Control Agency

References

External links
Official website

State agencies of Minnesota
State departments of labor of the United States